Edwin Cowles (1825–1890), born in Austinburg, Ohio, was notable as the publisher of The Cleveland Leader. During the President Abraham Lincoln administration and Civil War, he was appointed as US postmaster of Cleveland, serving April 4, 1861 - July 11, 1865. He later served as Vice-President of the 1884 Republican National Convention. He was the elder brother of Alfred Cowles, Sr., also a newspaper publisher.

See also
 Cowles Publishing Company

References

19th-century American newspaper publishers (people)
1825 births
1890 deaths
19th-century American journalists
Cowles family
American male journalists
19th-century American male writers
Ohio Republicans
Grand River Academy alumni